Gangseo District (Gangseo-gu) (Hangul: 강서구, Hanja: 江西區) is one of the 25 wards (gu) of Seoul, South Korea. It is located on the south side of the Han River. Gimpo Airport is in Gonghang-dong, where many flights fly to cities like Busan, Jeju, and Gwangju.

Administrative divisions

Balsan-dong (발산동 鉢山洞)
Banghwa-dong (방화동 傍花洞)
Gaehwa-dong (개화동 開花洞) --- called "beopjeongdong" administered by Banghwa-dong
Deungchon-dong (등촌동 登村洞)
Gayang-dong (가양동 加陽洞)
Magok-dong (마곡동 麻谷洞) --- called "beopjeongdong" administered by Balsan-dong
Gonghang-dong (공항동 空港洞)
Gwahae-dong (과해동 果海洞) --- called "beopjeongdong" administered by Gonghang-dong
Ogok-dong (오곡동 五谷洞) --- called "beopjeongdong" administered by Gonghang-dong
Osoe-dong (오쇠동 五釗洞) --- called "beopjeongdong" administered by Gonghang-dong
Hwagok-dong (화곡동 禾谷洞)
Yeomchang-dong (염창동 鹽倉洞)

Economy
The Korea Airports Corporation headquarters, Korean Air's headquarters, Korean Airport Service, Ltd., and Air Total Service are located in Gonghang-dong in Gangseo District. Asiana Airlines's headquarters are located in Asiana Town in Osoe-dong, Gangseo District. Jin Air has its headquarters in Deungchon-dong, Gangseo District. Eastarjet has its headquarters in Banghwa 2-dong.

Government and infrastructure
The Aviation and Railway Accident Investigation Board (ARAIB) FDR/CVR Analysis and Wreckage Laboratory is on the property of Gimpo International Airport in Gwahae-dong, Gangseo District. Previously the ARAIB had its headquarters in Gonghang-dong, Gangseo District. The ARAIB headquarters are now in Sejong City.

Attractions
Heojun Museum
SBS Open Hall

Transportation

Railway
Airport Railroad Co., Ltd.
AREX
(Gyeyang District, Incheon) ← Gimpo Airport → (Goyang), (Eunpyeong District)
Seoul Metro
Seoul Subway Line 2 Sinjeong Branch
(Yangcheon District) ← Kkachisan
Seoul Metropolitan Rapid Transit Corporation
Seoul Subway Line 5
Banghwa — Gaehwasan — Gimpo Airport — Magok — Balsan — Ujangsan — Hwagok — Kkachisan → (Yangcheon District)
Seoul Metro Line 9 Corporation
Seoul Subway Line 9
Gaehwa — Gimpo Airport — Airport Market — Sinbanghwa — Magongnaru — Yangcheon Hyanggyo — Gayang — Jeungmi — Deungchon — Yeomchang → (Yangcheon District)

Notable people
 Lee Guk-jong (born 1969), South Korean doctor
 Kim Gun-mo (born 1968), South Korean singer-songwriter (Originally from Busan, but raised in Gangseo-gu)
 Gong Hyo-jin (born 1980), South Korean actress (born in Sinwol-dong)
 Solar (Real Name: Kim Yong-sun, Hangul: 김용선, born 1991), singer-songwriter, dancer, lyricist, YouTuber, digital influencer and K-pop idol, leader and member of K-pop girlgroup Mamamoo
 Lee "Faker" Sang-hyeok (born 1996), League of Legends player, three time League of Legends World Championship winner with SK Telecom T1
 Hayoung (Real Name: Oh Ha-young, Hangul: 오하영, born 1996), singer, dancer, actress and K-pop idol, member of K-pop girlgroup Apink

Sister cities

 Zhaoyuan, Shandong, People's Republic of China

References

External links

Official site 

 
Districts of Seoul